At Christmas may refer to:

 At Christmas (Sara Evans album), 2014
At Christmas (Freddie Jackson album), 1994
 "At Christmas" (song), a 2016 song by Kylie Minogue
 James Taylor at Christmas, a 2006 album by James Taylor